Dirina is a genus of lichen-forming fungi in the family Roccellaceae. All Dirina species are crustose lichens with a whitish to greyish brown thallus, and live either on rock or on bark–some species can live on both. The  partner is a member of the green algal genus Trentepohlia. Most species occur in the Northern Hemisphere, and are generally restricted to coastal habitats, where they may be locally quite common. Erythrin and lecanoric acid are lichen products that usually occur in Dirina species, along with several other unidentified substances.

The genus was circumscribed in 1825 by Elias Magnus Fries. Swedish lichenologist Anders Tehler published a monograph about the genus in 1983. Thirty years later, he and his colleagues revisited Dirina, combining evidence from molecular phylogenetic analysis with morphological and chemical analysis. They accepted 24 species in Dirina, 9 of which were described as new to science.

Species

 Dirina angolana  – Angola
 Dirina approximata  – Galápagos Islands
 Dirina arabica  – Socotra Island
 Dirina astridae  – Mauritius
 Dirina badia  – Peru
 Dirina canariensis  – Canary Islands
 Dirina candida  – Mediterranean Basin
 Dirina catalinariae  – USA; Mexico
 Dirina ceratoniae  – Mediterranean Basin
 Dirina cretacea  – Mediterranean Basin
 Dirina fallax  – Africa; Europe
 Dirina immersa  – Socotra Island
 Dirina indica  – India
 Dirina insulana  – Macaronesia; Europe
 Dirina jamesii  – St. Helena, Ascension Island; Africa
 Dirina madagascariensis  – Madagascar
 Dirina massiliensis  – Mediterranean Basin; Central Europe
 Dirina mexicana  – Mexico
 Dirina monothalamia  – Cape Verde; Senegal
 Dirina pacifica  – Galapagos Islands; Hawaii
 Dirina pallescens  – Mexico
 Dirina paradoxa  – Caribbean 
 Dirina sorocarpa  – Cape Verde
 Dirina teichiodes  – Cape Verde

References

Arthoniomycetes genera
Lichen genera
Taxa named by Elias Magnus Fries
Taxa described in 1825